Betty Boop's Prize Show is a 1934 Fleischer Studios animated short film starring Betty Boop.

This is the second of a series of Betty Boop melodrama spoofs, which also included She Wronged Him Right (1934), No! No! A Thousand Times No!! (1935) and Honest Love and True (1938).

Plot

Betty and her boyfriend, Freddy, are appearing on stage at the Slumberland Theatre.  Betty is the school marm in an old style melodrama, and Freddy is the dashing hero, who rescues her from the clutches of Philip the Fiend.

References

External links
 Betty Boop's Prize Show at the Big Cartoon Database.
 Betty Boop's Prize Show on YouTube.
 

1934 films
Betty Boop cartoons
1930s American animated films
American black-and-white films
1934 animated films
Paramount Pictures short films
Fleischer Studios short films
Short films directed by Dave Fleischer